Demir Krasniqi was born on 10 June 1950 in the village of Tugjec near Kamenica, Kosovo. He went to school locally but studied music in secondary school and university in Pristina. His main mentor from early on in his schooling was the teacher Rexhep Bunjaku. In sixth grade, he took first place at a regional music competition known as “Mikrofoni është i Juaji” ("The Microphone Is Yours").

He worked as a music teacher in Kosovo schools, as he still does today.

He has written, composed, and recorded 1,500 original songs and dances on vinyl, cassettes, video, CD, and DVD. He collects folk songs as well, including over 4,000 in his repertoire, many of them collected by Lorenc Antoni in volumes IV-VII of his collection Bleni muzikor shqiptar.

Krasniqi is also a journalist, and currently lives and works in Gjilan.

Publications
 Mallëngjima e ushtima ("Wishes and Rumors"), Pristina, 1993
 Qamili i vogël-zë që nuk shuhet ("The Little Family Voice That Never Goes Away," monograph), Pristina, 1995
 Gjakon Kosova ("Kosovo Lives"), Gjilan, 1998
 Bejtë Pireva ("Bejtë Ali Pireva"), Gjilan, 2002
 Zeqir Maroca ("Zeqir Marocës"), Gjilan, 2002
 Këngë krismash lirie I ("Songs Crying Freedom"), Gjilan, 2003
 Këngë krismash lirie II, Pristina, 2003
 Familja Kurti nga Tygjeci ("The Kurti Family of Tugjec," monograph), Pristina, 2004
 Shtojzovallet e Gollakut  ("The Shtojzovalle of Gollak), Kosovo ETMM, Pristina, 2005
 Kushtrim lirie ("To Freedom"), Kurora Elementary School, Gjilan, 2005
 Liman Shahiqi-trimi i Gollakut ("Liman Shahiqi: Hero of Gollak"), Pristina, 2005
 Kroi i këngës ("The Source of Songs"), Gjilan, 2006
 Qamili i Vogël: Këngë përjetësie ("Qamili i Vogël: Eternal Songs," collected, edited, and interpreted by Demir Krasniqi), Gjilan, November 2006
 Krenaria e Gollakut ("Pride of Gollak, a 40-year career retrospective), Gjilan, 2008
 Diell Lirie ("Freedom Sun"), Gjilan, 2008

References

External links
 http://www.rapsodet.com/Tjera/Demir%20Krasniqi/Demir%20Krasniqi.htm
 http://www.zemrashqiptare.net/news/id_3474/rp_0/act_print/rf_1/Printo.html
 http://www.dituria.se/index.php?option=com_content&view=article&id=974:shaban-cakolli-demir-krasniqi&catid=44:debattartiklar&Itemid=63

Living people
1950 births
Kosovan singers
Kosovan writers